William J. Moore, Sr. (May 6, 1923 – August 11, 2015) was a member of the Pennsylvania State Senate, serving from 1973 to 1988. He was a Republican member of the Pennsylvania House of Representatives from 1971 to 1972. He died in 2015.

References

Republican Party Pennsylvania state senators
Republican Party members of the Pennsylvania House of Representatives
1923 births
2015 deaths